Intersections is the tenth album from progressive/thrash metal band Mekong Delta, released in April 2012. It is a compilation of songs from previous albums that were re-recorded with the current line-up.

Track listing
 "The Cure" - 04:15
 "Shades of Doom" - 04:20
 "Sphere Eclipse" - 06:18
 "The Healer" - 07:38
 "Innocent" - 05:20
 "Memories of Tomorrow" - 04:44
 "Heroes Grief" - 05:44
 "Heartbeat" - 07:04
 "Transgressor" - 03:38
 "Prophecy" - 04:25

Song origins
 Tracks 1 and 7 are from Mekong Delta (1987).
 Tracks 6 and 10 are from The Music of Erich Zann (1988).
 Track 2 is from The Principle of Doubt (1989).
 Track 9 is from Dances of Death (and Other Walking Shadows) (1990).
 Tracks 3, 5 and 8 are from Kaleidoscope (1992).
 Track 4 is from Visions Fugitives (1994).

Band line-up
Ralph Hubert — bass guitar
Martin Lemar — vocals
Alex Landenburg — drums
Erik Adam H. Grösch — guitars
Benedikt Zimniak — guitars

References

2012 albums
Mekong Delta (band) albums